Colo-I-Suva Forest Park is a nature reserve near Suva, Fiji. It offers hiking trails, swimming, and birdwatching. The forest is part of the Queen's Commonwealth Canopy.

History 

Established in 1872, Colo-i-Suva Forest National Park in Fiji is a two and a half square kilometres of verdant rain-forests renowned for tropical flora and birds. There are about four and a half kilometres of natural trails ploughing through the forests and natural water bodies to swim in.

The Waisila Creek flows through the Colo-i-Suva Forest National Park in Fiji making its way to Waimanu River. It is the water catchment for Nausori and Nasinu creek.

African mahogany, planted in the 1940s and 1950s, stands apart from the older native vegetation.

On 24 October 2018, Prince Harry, Duke of Sussex, travelled to the forest and dedicated it to the Queen's Commonwealth Canopy.

References 

Parks in Fiji
Forest reserves